Michael Costigan may refer to:

 Michael Costigan (film producer), American producer
 Michael Costigan (writer) (born 1931), Australian writer
Michael Costigan, character in The Reaping